The Santa Clara Broncos women's basketball team represents Santa Clara University  in NCAA Division I basketball competition. The team plays home games at the Leavey Center in Santa Clara, California and are members of the West Coast Conference.

History
Santa Clara began play in 1963. They played in the NorCal Conference from 1978 to 1982, the NorPace Conference from 1982 to 1985, and the West Coast Athletic Conference from 1985 to 1988 before joining the West Coast Conference in 1988. They have made the NCAA Tournament six times (1992, 1994, 1998, 1999, 2002, 2005), with one victory in the Tournament being in 1992 with a 73–71 win over California. They have made the WNIT six times (1991, 2000, 2001, 2003, 2006 and 2016), with an WNIT championship in 1991.

NCAA tournament results

References

External links